George Graham Martin (born 3 September 1933) is a former South African footballer who played as a full back.

Martin started his football career at Clyde juniors under coach Johnny Walker (South African Goalkeeper 1929-1931).

Eddie Firmani, Stuart Leary and Martin played at Clyde and representative Western Province schools, winning numerous cups and awards. At the time of Eddie Firmani and Stuart Leary accepted professional football contracts at Charlton Athletic F.C., but Martin's father refused the contract.

Martin represented Western Province and won Currie Cup titles in 1955 and 1956. Martin was offered a contract with Falkirk F.C., but Martin refused.

He represented the South African national team (then referred to as Springboks) from 1957 to 1959, as a member of the last South African soccer team to tour overseas before South Africa was suspended from FIFA. The team traveled to England on a two-week boat trip aboard the SA Carnarvon Castle. On this tour, Martin made his senior international debut on 16 November 1958, coming on as a replacement in a 3-1 loss to Portugal, at Nacional Lisbon.

On returning home to South Africa, Martin played in the NFL for Marist Brothers, Durban United and Cape Town City.

References

Living people
1933 births
South African soccer players
South Africa international soccer players
Durban United F.C. players
Cape Town City F.C. (NFL) players
Place of birth missing (living people)
Association football fullbacks
National Football League (South Africa) players